Frank Aloysius Scanlan (April 28, 1890 – April 9, 1969), was a Major League Baseball pitcher who played in  with the Philadelphia Phillies. He batted and threw left-handed. Scanlan had a 0–0 record, with a 1.64 ERA, in six games, in his one-year career. He was born in Syracuse, New York and died in Brooklyn, New York.

External links

1890 births
1969 deaths
Major League Baseball pitchers
Baseball players from Syracuse, New York
Philadelphia Phillies players
Atlanta Crackers players
Green Bay Bays players
Louisville Colonels (minor league) players
Davenport Blue Sox players
Rock Island Islanders players
Notre Dame Fighting Irish baseball players
Burials at St. John's Cemetery (Queens)